Jabal Ra'wayn is a sub-district located in Jiblah District, Ibb Governorate, Yemen. Jabal Ra'wayn had a population of 4081 according to the 2004 census.

References 

Sub-districts in Jiblah District